Yerong Creek is a closed railway station on the Main South railway line in New South Wales, Australia.  The station opened in 1880  and consisted of a weatherboard station building and signal box. The platform buildings were demolished in the 1980s and only a low platform remains at the site.

Layout 
The station opened with a crossing loop of about 400m length.  In 2010, the crossing loop was extended into a  7 km passing lane.  Exceptionally this passing lane has intermediate home signals protecting a level crossing and some wheat sidings which have the effect of allowing the passing lane to hold two trains in one direction.

Accidents and Incidents

2011 
 Signal Passed At Danger

References 

Disused regional railway stations in New South Wales
Railway stations in Australia opened in 1880
Railway stations closed in 1988
Main Southern railway line, New South Wales